Paula Blackton (née Hilburn; known professionally as Paula Dean; August 1, 1881 – March 27, 1930) was a silent-screen actress and film director.

Filmography
The Littlest Scout (1919)
The Diary of a Puppy (1917)
The Fairy Godfather (1917)
Satin and Calico (1917)
A Spring Idyl (1917)
The Collie Market (1917)
The Little Strategist (1917)

Director

The Littlest Scout (1919)

Writer

The Littlest Scout (1919)

Family
In 1906, the Georgia-born Paula Hilburn married director and producer J. Stuart Blackton. They had two children, Violet Virginia Blackton (Mrs Woolrich; 1910–1965) and Charles Stuart Blackton (1914–2007), both of whom became film actors, and featured in their mother's productions.

Death
Paula Blackton died of cancer in 1930 at the age of 48. She is buried at Hollywood Forever Cemetery.

References

External links

 
 Paula Blackton at Women Film Pioneers Project

1881 births
1930 deaths
Burials at Hollywood Forever Cemetery
American silent film actresses
20th-century American actresses
Women film pioneers